Costa Rica competed at the 1984 Summer Olympics in Los Angeles, United States.

Results by event

Athletics
Men's 100 metres
 Glen Abraham

Men's 200 metres
 Glen Abraham

Men's 5,000 metres 
 Orlando Mora
 Heat — 14:33.49 (→ did not advance)

Men's 10.000 metres
 Orlando Mora
 Heat — 30:49.43 (→ did not advance)

Men's Marathon
 Ronald Lanzoni — did not finish (→ no ranking)

Football (soccer)

Men's Team Competition
 Preliminary Round (Group D)
 Costa Rica – United States 0 – 3
 Costa Rica – Egypt 1 – 4
 Costa Rica – Italy 1 – 0
 Quarter Finals
 → Did not advance
Team Roster:
 ( 1.) Marco Antonio Rojas
 ( 4.) César Hines
 ( 5.) Marvin Obando
 ( 6.) German Chavarria 
 ( 7.) Juan Arnoldo Cayasso
 ( 8.) Carlos Santana 
 ( 9.) Leonidas Flores
 (10.) Enrique Rivers 
 (11.) Evaristo Coronado
 (12.) Minor Alpizar
 (13.) Carlos Toppings
 (14.) Guillermo Guardia
 (15.) Enrique Díaz
 (16.) Álvaro Solano
 (17.) Miguel Simpson-Lacey
 (18.) Luis Galagarza
 (22.) Alejandro González

Judo
Alvaro Sanabria Mora
Andrés Sancho
Condor Long
Ronny Sanabria

Shooting
Mariano Lara
Roger Cartín
Elizabeth Jagush
David Bourland

Swimming
Men's 200m Breaststroke
Andrés Aguilar
 Heat — 2:27.69 (→ did not advance, 29th place)

Men's 200m Butterfly
Andrés Aguilar
 Heat — 2:08.74 (→ did not advance, 29th place)

Men's 200m Individual Medley
Andrés Aguilar
 Heat — 2:11.63 (→ did not advance, 26th place)

References
Official Olympic Reports

Nations at the 1984 Summer Olympics
1984